Namorona is a river in Vatovavy, eastern Madagascar. It flows down from the central highlands, runs along the Ranomafana National Park, forms the Andriamamovoka Falls, to flow into the Indian Ocean. It empties near Namorona.

References

External links

 Pictures of Namorona River

Rivers of Madagascar
Rivers of Vatovavy